Staphylococcus massiliensis is a Gram-positive, coagulase-negative member of the bacterial genus Staphylococcus consisting of clustered cocci. Strains of this species were first isolated from a human brain abscess and were found to be most closely related to Staphylococcus piscifermentans, Staphylococcus condimenti, Staphylococcus carnosus subsp. carnosus, Staphylococcus carnosus subsp. utilis, and Staphylococcus simulans.  A subsequent study found that S. massiliensis may actually be part of the human skin microbiome and may have been a contaminant of brain abscess-derived samples.

References

External links
UniProt taxonomy
Type strain of Staphylococcus massiliensis at BacDive -  the Bacterial Diversity Metadatabase

massiliensis
Bacteria described in 2010